Shree is a Hindi language supernatural soap opera that aired on Zee TV channel. The series premiered on 22 December 2008 airing weekdays at 10:30pm. The series is produced by J.D. Majethia of Hats Off Productions, and stars Wasna Ahmed as Shree and Pankaj Tiwari as Hari in the main lead.

Cast 
 Wasna Ahmed as Shree Raghuvanshi: Hari's wife; Rudra and Naveli's mother (2008-2009)
 Pankaj Tiwari as Hari Raghuvanshi: Shree's husband; Rudra and Naveli's father (2008-2009)
 Veebha Anand as Kangana: Hari's former lover. She was killed by Anant on her marriage day. Her ghost inhabited the Raghuvanshi house. She wanted to kill Shree so she can marry Hari. She wanted to ruin the Raghuvanshi family but she repented and left the house. (2008-2009)
 Jiten Lalwani as Anant Raghuvanshi
 Shalmili Toyle as Madhu Raghuvanshi
 Sparsh Khanchandani as Naveli Raghuvanshi: Shree and Hari's daughter and Rudra's sister
 Trishna Vivek as Nikki Raghuvanshi
 Mehul Buch as Narottam 
 Aruna Irani as Shree's mother
 Madhurima Tuli as Bindiya
 Nimisha Vakharia as Putlibai 
 Anang Desai as Saptarishi Maharaj
 Meet Mandavia as Chotu
 Quophi Asare as GoddySly

Plot 
Haunted by Kangana, the ghost of his first contender, Hari meets a sweet young woman called Shree in strange circumstances. However, after getting to know each other better, the two young people fell in love and ended up getting married without worrying about the consequences.

Trapped by a wizard then released accidentally by Shree, Kangana returns to take revenge on the Shree-Hari couple and tries to win back the love of her life. And, later, she does not hesitate to trap Hari to make an agreement with Shree which would allow him to have control over one of the false twins to be born of her rival.

6 years later

Kangana, having released Hari, therefore passed agreement. Shree who was pregnant, gave birth to fraternal twins whose boy, Rudra, only lives to support Kangana's cause. At the age of 6, he nourished, under the influence of this ghost, the desire to kill his mother and make Kangana his own by wanting to give her to his father as a wife. But, in the case of her twin sister, Naveli, that is out of the question. Thus, the story expands, and the children of Shree, endowed with magical powers, become involved.

References

External links
Shree Official Site on Zee TV
Shrii News Article

Indian television soap operas
Zee TV original programming
2008 Indian television series debuts
2009 Indian television series endings
Hats Off Productions
Indian supernatural television series
Indian romance television series
Indian television shows